West Clifford  is a community in the Canadian province of Nova Scotia, located in the Lunenburg Municipal District in Lunenburg County.

Communities in Lunenburg County, Nova Scotia
General Service Areas in Nova Scotia